The Men's Keirin at the 2014 Commonwealth Games, as part of the cycling programme, was held on 27 July 2014.

Results

First round

Heat 1

Heat 2

Heat 3

Heat 4

Repechages

Heat 1

Heat 2

Heat 3

Heat 4

Semifinal round

Heat 1

Heat 2

Finals

1st to 6th

7th to 12th

References

Men's Keirin
Cycling at the Commonwealth Games – Men's keirin